Rodrigo Ariel Sevillano Cabezas known as Rodrigo Sevillano and as Ariel Sevillano (born 17 April 1985) is a Colombian footballer who plays as a defender for América de Cali of the Categoría Primera B.

References

External links
 Profile at BDFA 
 

1985 births
Living people
Colombian footballers
Deportivo Pasto footballers
Cúcuta Deportivo footballers
Boyacá Chicó F.C. footballers
Independiente Santa Fe footballers
Tiro Federal footballers
General Díaz footballers
América de Cali footballers
Colombian expatriate footballers
Expatriate footballers in Argentina
Expatriate footballers in Paraguay
People from Barbacoas, Nariño
Association football defenders
Sportspeople from Nariño Department